Kalihati is an upazila of Tangail District, Dhaka Division, Bangladesh.

History

It has a historical background during the liberation war in 1971. A great child of this land named Kader Siddiqui who later gained the great title "Bir Uttom" for his contribution to the war. After the liberation war he gave 32 trucks of weapons to the government. In the liberation period he formed a group named "Kaderia Bahini" with the brave bangalees. The "Kaderia Bahini" was very ferocious against the Pakistanis.

The Kalihati thana was established in 1928 and was turned into an upazila in 1983.

Geography
It has 65035 households and total area of 295.6 km2.The upazila is surrounded by Bhuapur & Ghatail Upazila on the north, Tangail Sadar and Basail Upazila on the south,  Sakhipur Upazila on the east, and the Jamuna River on the west.

Demographics
As of the 2011 Bangladesh census, Kalihati has a population of 410,293. Males constitute 51.55% of the population, and females 48.45%. Kalihati has an average literacy rate of 42.9% (7+ years). Literacy rate for male is 46.1% and for female is 39.8%.

Administration
Kalihati Upazila is divided into 2 municipalities and 13 union parishads: Balla, Bangra, Bir Bashinda, Dashkia, Durgapur, Gohaliabari, Kok Dohora, Nagbari Union, Narandia, Paikara, Parkhi, Salla and Shahadebpur.

Kalihati Municipality is subdivided into 9 wards and 18 mahallas.

Elenga Municipality was established in 2013.

Education
 Biyara Marua Govt. Primary School
 Elenga High School
 Jetendra Bala Girls High School
 Samsul Haque College 
 Lutfor Rahman Motin Mohila College
 Elenga BM College
 Bangabandhu Textile Engineering College
 Kalihati College
 Kalihati R S Govt. Pilot High School
 Rajafair High School
 Nagbari Hasina Chowdhury  High  School 
 Balla high school and College
 Rampur High School
 Lion Ferdous alom Firoz high School & College
 Narandia TRKN High School & College
 Nagar Bari Agriculture College
 Nagar Bari BM College
 Gopal Dighi K.P.U. High School
 Kasturipara Adarsha Junior Girls School
 Khilda High School
 Potol High School

Notable residents
 Debapriya Bhattacharya, economist
 Abu Sayeed Chowdhury, jurist and President of Bangladesh (1972–1973); born in Nagbari in 1921
 Manna, film actor and producer; born in Elenga village in 1964 and is buried there
 Abdul Kader Siddique
 Abdul Latif Siddiqui, Member of Parliament for constituency Tangail-4 1996–2001 and 2009–2015
Shajahan Siraj, Member of Parliament for constituency Tangail-4

See also 
Kalihati Town
Upazilas of Bangladesh
Districts of Bangladesh
Divisions of Bangladesh

References

 
Upazilas of Tangail District